Emirazizli is a village, in the Honaz District of the Denizli Province in Turkey.

References

Villages in Honaz District